The 1947–48 Army Cadets men's ice hockey season was the 45th season of play for the program but first under the oversight of the NCAA. The Cadets represent the United States Military Academy and were coached by Len Patten, in his 3rd season.

Season
Army began the season with few expectations for its ice hockey program. While the Cadets were members of the Pentagonal League, they had gone winless against the other four members the year before and, as a result, only scheduled one game against their four other teams as opposed to the normal two. However, when the Cadets began their season they were performing better than they had in years.

After opening the season with a win, Army defeated Yale in what was considered to be a major upset. Army flagged a bit in their next match, losing to Colgate but then rallied to dominate in two shutout victories, albeit against inferior competition.

By the end of January Army was sitting with an enviable record with both of their close losses coming against strong foes. They travelled to Boston for just their second road game of the year and were humbled by Harvard to the tune of 1–7. The Cadets returned to West Point to lick their wounds and then took revenge against a hapless Lehigh squad, nearly equaling the 12–1 drubbing they had handed out the year before.

In Army's showdown with Dartmouth, the Cadets faced off against the top team in the nation. Though they lost the match, the fact that they were able to keep the score close indicated just how far they had come. The team finished out the season without another loss and were able to defeat Princeton to finish 3rd in the Pentagonal League. Army set a new program record for wins in a season and produced what was probably the best season in program history to that point.

Roster

Standings

Schedule and results

|-
!colspan=12 style=";" | Regular Season

References

Army Black Knights men's ice hockey seasons
Army
Army
Army